

List of ambassadors

Chaim Choshen 2016 - 
Uri Gutman 2013 - 2016
Tuvia Israeli 2009 - 2013
Yigal Baruch Caspi 2005 - 2009
Uzi Manor 2001 - 2005
Arie Arazi 1995 - 2000
Asher Naim 1992 - 1995
Zvi Kedar (Non-Resident, Tokyo) 1978 - 1980
Emmanuel Ron 1977 - 1978
Amnon Ben-Yochanan 1973 - 1977
Yehuda Horam 1969 - 1973
Mordekhai Shneeron (Non-Resident, Tokyo) 1963 - 1966
Daniel Lewin (diplomat) (Non-Resident, Tokyo) 1962 - 1963

References

Korea (South)
Israel